Erasmus Desiderius Wandera (16 April 1930 – 8 December 2022) was a Ugandan Roman Catholic priest who served as the Bishop of the Roman Catholic Diocese of Soroti, from 29 March 1981 until 27 June 2007.

Wandera died on 8 December 2022, at the age of 92.

Background and priesthood
Wandera was born on 16 April 1930 in Dabani, in present-day Busia District, in the Eastern Region of Uganda. On 27 December 1956, he was ordained a priest. He served as a priest until 29 November 1980.

As bishop
Wandera was appointed Bishop of Soroti on 29 November 1980 and was consecrated a bishop on 29 March 1981, by Cardinal Emmanuel Kiwanuka Nsubuga, Archbishop of Kampala, assisted by Bishop James Odongo, Bishop of Tororo, and Archbishop Henri Lemaître†, Titular Archbishop of Tongres. Wandera served as bishop until 2007. On 27 Jun 2007, Bishop Erasmus Desiderius Wandera retired. He passed on the feast of the Immaculate Conception on 8th December 2022.

References

External links
 Profile of the Roman Catholic Archdiocese of Soroti
 The Bishops of the Roman Catholic Diocese of Soroti

1930 births
2022 deaths
20th-century Roman Catholic bishops in Uganda
21st-century Roman Catholic bishops in Uganda
People from Busia District, Uganda
Roman Catholic bishops of Soroti
Bishops appointed by Pope John Paul II